The following highways are/were numbered 930:

Costa Rica
 National Route 930

Ireland
 R390 regional road

United States